Gaobeidian is a county-level city in central Hebei province, People's Republic of China. It is under the administration of Baoding Prefecture-level city. Gaobeidian has 4 subdistricts, 6 towns, and 4 townships, and a total of 442 villages.

Gaobeidian City was long known as Xincheng County. In 1993, its name was changed to Gaobeidian City.

Administrative Divisions
Subdistricts:
Heping Subdistrict, Juncheng Subdistrict, Dongsheng Subdistrict, Beicheng Subdistrict, Xinghua Road Subdistrict

Towns:
Fangguan, Xincheng, Sizhuang, Baigou, Xinlizhuang

Townships:
Xiaoguanying Township, Liangjiaying Township, Zhangliuzhuang Township, Dongmaying Township, Xinqiao Township

Climate

Transportation
 Jingguang railway: Gaobeidian Railway Station
 Jingshi Expressway
 Jingkun Expressway
 China National Highway 107

Architecture and environment 
Gaobeidian is known for its leadership in energy efficient building, and hosted the 23rd International Passive House Conference in 2019. The Gaobeidian Railway City apartment complex is the world's largest passive house project.

See also
 Kaishan Temple

External links 

 Gaobeidian City Government Website

 
County-level cities in Hebei
Sustainable architecture
Geography of Baoding